Maverick City, Vol. 3 Pt. 2 is the second live album by American contemporary worship music collective Maverick City Music, which was released on October 9, 2020. The featured worship leaders on the album are Amanda Lindsey Cook, Naomi Raine, Aaron Moses, Chandler Moore, Maryanne J. George, Osby Berry, Brandon Lake, and Nate Moore. The album was produced by Jonathan Jay and Tony Brown.

Maverick City Vol. 3 Pt. 2 achieved commercial success upon its release, the album having debuted at No. 4 on Billboard's Top Christian Albums Chart and No. 2 on Top Gospel Albums Chart in the United States, and No. 8 on the Official Christian & Gospel Albums Chart in the United Kingdom. It was also nominated for the Billboard Music Award for Top Gospel Album at the 2021 Billboard Music Awards.

Release and promotion
On June 19, 2020, Maverick City Music released the official music video of "The Story I'll Tell" featuring Naomi Raine, indicating that the song is one of the tracks to be released on Maverick City Vol. 3 Pt. 2. On September 24, 2020, Maverick City Music released the official music video of "Be Praised" featuring Naomi Raine and Aaron Moses, also announcing that the release date for the album is slated for October 9, 2020. Maverick City Vol. 3 Pt. 2 was released on October 9, 2020, with the official music video for "To You" featuring Chandler Moore and Maryanne Joshua George also being released on the same day.

Reception

Accolades

Commercial performance
In the United States, the album debuted at number four on Top Christian Albums Chart, and number two on Top Gospel Albums Chart.

In the United Kingdom, Maverick City Vol. 3 Pt. 2 debuted on the OCC's Official Christian & Gospel Albums Chart at No. 8.

Track listing

Charts

Weekly charts

Year-end charts

Release history

References

External links
  on MultiTracks

2020 live albums
Maverick City Music albums